James Leith is the name of:

 James Leith (British Army officer, born 1763) (1763–1816), Scottish lieutenant-general in the Napoleonic Wars
 James Leith (VC) (1826–1869), Scottish recipient of the Victoria Cross
 James Leith Leith (born 1896), First World War fighter ace